Royal Consort Jo of the Pungyang Jo clan (Hangul: 조비 풍양 조씨, Hanja: 趙妃 豐壤 趙氏), also known as Princess Consort (Queen) Chungseon (Hangul: 충선왕비, Hanja: 忠宣王妃), was the fifth wife of King Chungseon of Goryeo.

References

 
Royal Consort Jo on Encykorea .
Princess Consort Chungseon on Encykorea .

13th-century births
14th-century deaths
Consorts of Chungseon of Goryeo
14th-century Korean women
13th-century Korean women